Hun Neang (Chinese: 云良; 27 August 1924 – 12 July 2013) was the father of Cambodia's Prime Minister, Hun Sen. A devout Buddhist, various schools throughout the country are named in honour after him. Hun Neang's official, full title is "Neak Oknha Moha Pheakdey Saburisak Phoukea Thipadei", which was presented to him by King Norodom Sihamoni in 2011.

Biography
Hun Neang was born on 27 August 1924, at the district of Stung Trang in Kampong Cham province. He was a resident monk in a local Wat in Kampong Cham province before defrocking himself to join the French resistance and married Hun Sen's mother, Dy Pok in the 1940s. Hun Neang's paternal grandparents were wealthy landowners of Teochew Chinese heritage. Hun Neang inherited some of his family assets and led a relatively comfortable life, as they owned several hectares of land until a kidnapping incident forced their family to sell off much of their assets. His wife Dy Pok died in 1998 of illness at the age of 81.

Hun Neang and Dy Pok had six children, of which Prime Minister Hun Sen is the third child. He also had 30 grandchildren and 66 great grandchildren.

Death and funeral
Hun Neang battled health issues in March 2012, according to his son, Hun Sen. He died on Friday, 12 July 2013, aged 88.

His funeral was held at Hun Sen's residence near the Independence Monument. Government officials and foreign leaders attended the funeral and sent their condolences to Hun Sen, including Vietnamese Prime Minister Nguyen Tan Dung, Thai former Prime Minister Thaksin Shinawatra, and Thai Prime Minister Yingluck Shinawatra. King Norodom Sihamoni and Queen-Mother Norodom Monineath were also present. He was interred near his wife's crypt in Vongkut Borei Pagoda in Toek Thla commune, Sen Sok district.

References

1924 births
2013 deaths
Cambodian Buddhists
Cambodian Theravada Buddhists
Cambodian people of Chinese descent
People from Kampong Cham province
Hun Sen
Hun family